St Pancras Cambridge Street Diesel Sidings was a stabling point located in Kings Cross, London, England. The depot was situated on the Midland Main Line and was near St Pancras station.

The depot code was PA.

History 
Before its closure in 1984, Class 08 shunters, Class 20, 24, 25, 27, 40, 44 and 47 locomotives could be seen at the depot.

References 

Railway depots in London